Bookajet is a British aircraft charter and management company based at Farnborough Airport.

Bookajet Limited holds a United Kingdom Civil Aviation Authority AOC and Type B Operating Licence.

Services 
 Aircraft Charter
 Helicopter Charter
 Aircraft Management 
 Aircraft Sales
 Operations Support
 Jet Black Card Block Hours Programme

Fleet 
Bookajet has experience operating the following aircraft types:

 Bombardier Global XRS
 Bombardier Global 5000
 Bombardier Challenger 300
 Gulfstream GIV SP
 Dassault Falcon 900LX
 Embraer Legacy 650
 Embraer Legacy 600
 Cessna Citation Sovereign
 Cessna Citation Excel / XLS / XLS+ 
 Cessna Citation CJ / CJ2+
 Hawker 800XP / 850XP
 Hawker Beechcraft Raytheon 390 Premier 1
 King Air 350i

References

Airlines of the United Kingdom